Jean Jacques Émile Cheysson (Nîmes, 18 May 1836 – Leysin, 7 February 1910) was a French ingenieur, designer of roads and bridges, and social reformer, who made a career as in industry and in the French administration. He has played an important role in the institutionalization of statistics in France, and has published a series of graphic statistical albums for the French Ministry of Public Works, which are considered as extraordinary examples of data visualization. At the same time, he was a disciple of Frédéric Le Play and resumed sociological work and his monographic method.

Cheysson was a graduate of the École Polytechnique, where he graduated in 1854. Under Frédéric Le Play he participated in the organization of the Universal Exhibition of 1867. He was director of the Le Creusot factories in Le Creusot from 1871 to 1874, professor of political and social economics at the Ecole libre des sciences politiques and professor of industrial economics at the École des mines, and then inspector general of Ponts et Chaussées.

Gallery

References

External links 

 Émile Cheysson (1836-1910) at data.bnf.fr

1836 births
1910 deaths
19th-century French cartographers
Information visualization experts
People from Nîmes